The 1999 NCAA Division III football season, part of the college football season organized by the NCAA at the Division III level in the United States, began in August 1999, and concluded with the NCAA Division III Football Championship, also known as the Stagg Bowl, in December 1999 at Salem Football Stadium in Salem, Virginia. 

The Pacific Lutheran Lutes won their first Division III championship by defeating the Rowan Profs, 42−13. The Lutes were led by All-American quarterback Chad Johnson, running back Anthony Hicks and offensive lineman Andrew Finstuen. College Football Hall of Fame coach Frosty Westering won his fourth national championship. 

The Gagliardi Trophy, given to the most outstanding player in Division III football, was awarded to Danny Ragsdale, quarterback from Redlands.

Conference standings

Conference champions

Postseason
The 1999 NCAA Division III Football Championship playoffs were the 27th annual single-elimination tournament to determine the national champion of men's NCAA Division III college football. The championship Stagg Bowl game was held at Salem Football Stadium in Salem, Virginia for the seventh time. This was the first bracket to feature 28 teams after expanding from the previous format of 16 teams in place from 1985 to 1998. With the new format, four teams were given byes to the second round.

Playoff bracket
{{32TeamBracket-Compact-NoSeeds-Byes
| RD1=First RoundCampus Sites
| RD2=Second RoundCampus Sites
| RD3=QuarterfinalsCampus Sites
| RD4=SemifinalsCampus Sites
| RD5=National Championship GameSalem Football StadiumSalem, Virginia

| RD1-team03= 
| RD1-score03= 39
| RD1-team04= 
| RD1-score04=32
| RD1-team05= 
| RD1-score05= 56
| RD1-team06= 
| RD1-score06=14
| RD1-team07= 
| RD1-score07= 42
| RD1-team08= 
| RD1-score08= 19

| RD1-team11= 
| RD1-score11= 37
| RD1-team12= 
| RD1-score12= 34
| RD1-team13= 
| RD1-score13= 29
| RD1-team14= 
| RD1-score14= 10
| RD1-team15= 
| RD1-score15= 43
| RD1-team16= 
| RD1-score16= 38

| RD1-team19= Pacific Lutheran
| RD1-score19= 28
| RD1-team20= 
| RD1-score20= 24
| RD1-team21= 
| RD1-score21= 38
| RD1-team22= 
| RD1-score22= 17
| RD1-team23= 
| RD1-score23= 23
| RD1-team24= 
| RD1-score24=10

| RD1-team27= 
| RD1-score27= 20
| RD1-team28= 
| RD1-score28= 16
| RD1-team29= 
| RD1-score29= 28
| RD1-team30= 
| RD1-score30= 21
| RD1-team31= 
| RD1-score31= 14
| RD1-team32= 
| RD1-score32=7

| RD2-team01= 
| RD2-score01= 42
| RD2-team02= Augustana (IL)
| RD2-score02= 33
| RD2-team03= Ohio Northern
| RD2-score03= 58
| RD2-team04= Wittenberg
| RD2-score04= 24

| RD2-team05= 
| RD2-score05= 24
| RD2-team06= Montclair State
| RD2-score06= 32
| RD2-team07=Rowan
| RD2-score07= 55
| RD2-team08= Ursinus
| RD2-score08=0

| RD2-team09= 
| RD2-score09= 14
| RD2-team10= Pacific Lutheran
| RD2-score10=  49
| RD2-team11= Central (IA)
| RD2-score11= 9
| RD2-team12= Saint John's (MN)
| RD2-score12=10| RD2-team13= | RD2-score13= 20| RD2-team14= McDaniel
| RD2-score14= 16
| RD2-team15= Hardin–Simmons| RD2-score15= 51| RD2-team16= Wash. & Jefferson
| RD2-score16=3

| RD3-team01= Mount Union| RD3-score01= 56| RD3-team02= Ohio Northern
| RD3-score02=31

| RD3-team03=Montclair State
| RD3-score03= 13
| RD3-team04= Rowan| RD3-score04=42| RD3-team05= Pacific Lutheran| RD3-score05= 19| RD3-team06= Saint John's (MN)
| RD3-score06=9

| RD3-team07= Trinity (TX)| RD3-score07=40| RD3-team08= Hardin–Simmons
| RD3-score08=33

| RD4-team01= Mount Union
| RD4-score01= 17
| RD4-team02=Rowan| RD4-score02= 24*| RD4-team03= Pacific Lutheran| RD4-score03= 49| RD4-team04=Trinity (TX)
| RD4-score04=28

| RD5-team01= Rowan
| RD5-score01= 13
| RD5-team02= Pacific Lutheran| RD5-score02= 42}}
* Overtime

 Final AFCA Top 25 Poll 

Others receiving votes: Buffalo St 118, Alma 109, Washington (Mo.) 85,  Wilmington 13, McMurry 9, Redlands 9, Union 9, Pomona-Pitzer 5, Aurora 5, Millikin 4, Williams 3, John Carroll 3, Otterbein 1. 

Awards
Gagliardi Trophy: Danny Ragsdale, Redlands

AFCA Coach of the Year: Larry Kehres, Mount Union

AFCA Regional Coach of the Year: Region 1: Peter Mazzaferro, Bridgewater State Region 2: Frank Girardi, Lycoming Region 3: Steve Mohr, Trinity (TX) Region 4: Larry Kehres, Mount Union Region 5''': Rick Willis, Wartburg

See also
1999 NCAA Division I-A football season
1999 NCAA Division I-AA football season
1999 NCAA Division II football season

References